Emerald-striped slim or green-striped slim (Aciagrion pinheyi) is a damselfly described by Samways in 2001.

Aciagrion pinheyi, Aciagrion gracile and Aciagrion hamoni have many similarities; the taxonomy and identification of this group requires revision.

References

Coenagrionidae
Taxobox binomials not recognized by IUCN